Deland may refer to:

People
 Betty Deland, Swedish actor
 Carolina Deland, Swedish actor 
 Charlotta Deland, Swedish actor
 Pierre Deland, Swedish actor

Places
 DeLand, Florida
 De Land, Illinois